Carex × uzenensis is a hybrid species of sedge and is native to Japan. Its parents are Carex forficula and Carex podogyna.

References

uzenensis
Flora of Japan
Plant nothospecies